Leonel Jorge Núñez (born 13 October 1984) is an Argentine footballer who last played as a forward for Nueva Chicago.

Career

Argentinos Juniors

From 2004 to 2007 Núñez played for Argentinos Juniors in the Argentine Primera División. He finished the 2006 Apertura tournament with 8 goals, and was in the top ten goalscorers. During the Clausura tournament 2007 he scored one of the goals of the season from his own half against Belgrano de Córdoba. His goals helped Argentinos Juniors move away from the bottom four in the Primera División relegation table for the first time in nearly three years. The young striker attracted a lot of attention from many big European clubs during his time in Argentina due to his prolific goal-scoring ratio.

Olympiacos

In June 2007, Núñez signed with Greek club Olympiacos for €3 million as reported. He agreed personal terms for a four-year contract worth €500,000 a season.

Núñez scored his first goal for Olympiacos in a pre-season friendly against Turkish club Ankaragücü. On 16 January 2008, Núñez scored his first official goal for Olympiacos. It was a brilliant scissor kick to make it 4-0 in the Greek cup derby match against Panathinaikos. Núñez recorded his first league goal, essentially a decider, shortly afterwards in the game against OFI Crete. With Olympiacos he won the Greek Super League, the Greek Cup as well as the Greek Super Cup.

Club Atlético Independiente

In 2008, Núñez was signed by Independiente. His terrific displays and his contribution of seven goals in his first tournament were not enough to prevent Independiente from finishing in 18th place, however. On May 9, 2010, Nuñez  scored a goal directly from the corner against his former team Argentinos Juniors.

Bursaspor

On 1 August 2010 he signed with Turkish champions Bursaspor on a 2+1 one-year deal for an undisclosed fee.

Johor Darul Takzim 

He made his debut against Selangor FA by replacing Nurul Azwan Roya when Johor Darul Takzim trailed by 1-0 in the second leg of Malaysia FA Cup quarter-final and subsequently helped Johor DT by scoring 2 goals to complete the comeback to bring the match to a penalty shootout. He was one of the penalty kickers and succeeded, which brought Johor DT to the Malaysia FA Cup semi-final against Pahang FA with a 4-2 win against Selangor FA through the penalty shootout. His third goal for Johor Darul Takzim was scored when Johor Darul Takzim won against Pahang 1-0 in a subsequent league match.

OFI Crete

On 12 February 2014 he signed a contract with OFI Crete.

PS TNI

On 1 March 2017. Núñez signed a contract with PS TNI. And he has made 5 score for the club.

References

External links

 Argentine Primera statistics
Guardian statistics

1984 births
Living people
Footballers from Buenos Aires
Argentine footballers
Argentine expatriate footballers
Argentinos Juniors footballers
Expatriate footballers in Greece
Expatriate footballers in Turkey
Association football forwards
Club Atlético Independiente footballers
Olympiacos F.C. players
People from Buenos Aires
Bursaspor footballers
Süper Lig players
Super League Greece players
Argentine Primera División players
Johor Darul Ta'zim F.C. players
OFI Crete F.C. players